Gildas Philippe (born 4 February 1973) is a French yacht racer who competed in the 2000 Summer Olympics and in the 2004 Summer Olympics.

References

External links 
 
 
 
 

1977 births
Living people
French male sailors (sport)
Olympic sailors of France
Sailors at the 2000 Summer Olympics – 470
Sailors at the 2004 Summer Olympics – 470
470 class world champions
Farr 30 class world champions
World champions in sailing for France